Cool It Down is the fifth studio album by American indie rock band Yeah Yeah Yeahs, released on September 30, 2022, through Secretly Canadian. It marks the group's first album since 2013's Mosquito and their first release through Secretly Canadian. The lead single "Spitting Off the Edge of the World" featuring Perfume Genius was released on June 1, 2022. The band began a world tour in support of the record from June 2022.

Cool It Down received acclaim from music critics and is nominated for Best Alternative Music Album at the 65th Annual Grammy Awards.

Background
In a press release, Karen O stated: "Don't have to tell you how much we've been going through in the last nine years since our last record, because you've been going through it too [...] So yes we've taken our time, happy to report when it's ready it really does just flow out." The title of the album was taken from the Velvet Underground song of the same name from their 1970 album Loaded, while lead single "Spitting Off the Edge of the World" was inspired by the climate crisis. "Fleez," the album's fourth track, incorporates elements from fellow New York City band ESG's 1981 song "Moody".

Yeah Yeah Yeahs first teased new music in early May 2022 after announcing shows in New York City and Los Angeles in October.

Critical reception

Cool It Down was acclaimed by critics upon its release. At Metacritic, which assigns a normalized rating out of 100 to reviews from mainstream publications, the album received an average score of 82, based on 22 reviews.

Reviewing the album for AllMusic, Heather Phares wrote that "For a band who seemed so impulsive at the outset, Yeah Yeah Yeahs' reflection and deliberation has been a surprising strength that's only grown with time. They may never lose all their restlessness -- nor should they -- but it's undeniable that Cool It Down is one of their most consistent albums." Writing for NME, Erica Campbell declared that, "Despite its acute focus on the current bleak state of things, the album shines a light on a brighter and divergent future; not just for the world, but for a band who continues to evolve among critiques that their past is the best part of them."

Phillipe Roberts was more reserved in praising the album for Pitchfork, claiming that; "Yeah Yeah Yeahs spend some of Cool It Downs sharpest moments citing and deconstructing their influences with refreshing candor. ... But every now and then, [Karen O's] reliable lyrical workhorse hits a brick wall."

Track listing

PersonnelYeah Yeah Yeahs Karen O – vocals, synthesizer
 Nick Zinner – guitar, synthesizer
 Brian Chase – drums, cymbals, percussionAdditional musicians Perfume Genius – vocals (1)
 Anthony Paul Lopez – percussion (4)
 Justin Raisen – sound effects (4)
 Mark Nishita – synthesizer (4, 8)
 Stephen Hussey – orchestra leader (5)
 Urban Soul – strings (5, 7)Technical'
 Greg Calbi – mastering
 Steve Fallone – mastering
 Shawn Everett – mixing
 Derek Coburn – engineering (1–3, 6)
 Mario Ramirez – engineering (1–3, 6)
 Justin Raisen – engineering (4, 8)
 Anthony Paul Lopez – engineering (4, 8)
 Ainjel Emme – engineering (4)
 Adam Noble – engineering (5, 7)
 Andrew Wyatt – engineering (5, 7)
 Jens Jungkurth – engineering (5, 7)
 Tim O'Sullivan – engineering (5, 7)
 Will Purton – engineering (5, 7)

Charts

References

2022 albums
Albums produced by Dave Sitek
Secretly Canadian albums
Yeah Yeah Yeahs albums